Ferdinand Faithfull Begg FRSE (middle name sometimes spelt Faithful; 27 December 1847 in Edinburgh – 4 December 1926 in Hove, Sussex) was a Scottish stockbroker and Unionist politician. He served as Chairman of the Edinburgh Stock Exchange (1885–87) and Chairman of the London Chamber of Commerce (1912–15).

He was Senior Partner of Faithfull Begg & Co Stockbrokers in London (1887–1913).

He was Member of Parliament for Glasgow St Rollox from 17 July 1895, to 4 October 1900.

Private life

He was born in Edinburgh the son of Rev James Begg DD and Maria Faithful. He was privately educated.

In 1873 he married Jessie Maria Cargill (d.1925). They had several children, including Francis Cargill Begg, Maria Faithfull Palmer, Jessie Begg, Elizabeth Begg and James Begg.

He died in Hove, Sussex.

References

External links 
 
 

1847 births
1926 deaths
Members of the Parliament of the United Kingdom for Glasgow constituencies
UK MPs 1895–1900
19th-century Scottish businesspeople
19th-century Scottish politicians
Fellows of the Royal Society of Edinburgh
British stockbrokers
Scottish Tory MPs (pre-1912)
Politicians from Edinburgh
Businesspeople from Edinburgh